The Georgia–Russia border is the state border between Georgia and Russia. It is de jure 894 km (556 mi) in length and runs from the Black Sea coast in the west and then along the Greater Caucasus Mountains to the tripoint with Azerbaijan in the east, thus closely following the conventional boundary between Europe and Asia. In 2008 Russia (and later four other states) recognised the independence of two self-declared republics within Georgia (Abkhazia and South Ossetia), meaning that in a de facto sense the border is now split into four sections: the Abkhazia–Russia border in the west, the western Georgia–Russia border between Abkhazia and South Ossetia, the South Ossetia–Russia border and the eastern Georgia–Russia border between South Ossetia and Azerbaijan. At present most of the international community refuse to recognise the independence of the two territories and regard them as belonging to Georgia.

Description

Georgia-Russia border (western section)

The border starts in the west at the point where the Psou river enters the Black Sea, just west of the town of the Leselidze. It then follows the Psou as it flows north and then east to the vicinity of Mount Agepsta, whereupon it then follows the crest of the Caucasus Mountains broadly south-eastwards over to the mount Zekara. Mount Dombay-Ulgen, Shota Rustaveli Peak, Mount Janga, Mount Lalveri, and Mount Khalatsa are prominent peaks of this section.

Georgia-Russia border (eastern section)
The eastern section of the Georgia–Russia border starts at the mount Zekara and continues eastwards along the Caucasus Mountains to the tripoint with Azerbaijan. Mount Diklosmta, Mount Kazbek, Mount Dzhimara, Mount Shani, Mount Shkhara and Mount Tebulosmta are notable peaks of this section.

History
 
During the 19th the Caucasus region was contested between the declining Ottoman Empire, Persia and Russia, which was expanding southwards. Russia formally annexed the eastern Georgian Kingdom of Kartli and Kakheti in 1801, followed by the western Georgian Kingdom of Imereti in 1804, following the Russian treaty with North Ossetia and the construction of Vladikavkaz as a base in 1784. Construction of the Georgian Military Road was begun in 1799, following the Treaty of Georgievsk. Over the course of the 1800s Russia continued to push its frontier southwards, at the expense of the Persian and Ottoman Empires.

The Georgian territories were initially organised into the Georgia Governorate, then later split off as the Georgia-Imeretia Governorate from 1840 to 1846, and finally divided into the governorates of Tiflis and Kutaisi. The northern border of these territories roughly corresponds with the modern Georgia–Russia border i.e. running along the Caucasus Mountain range. Abkhazia was formed as semi-autonomous region in 1810, with a border with Georgia set along the river Ghalizga. In 1864 Abkhazia was re-designated as the 'Sukhum Military District' (from 1883 Sukhum Okrug, within Kutaisi Governorate), incorporating the Samurzakano region west of the Ingur river which had hitherto been part of Kutais governorate and generally considered historical Georgian land. However the western border of Abkhazia was set at the Begepsta river, with lands west of this attached to the Chermorskii okrug in modern Krasnodar Krai. Over the following decades the ethnic makeup of Abkhazia changed due to influxes of Georgian and Russian settlers.

 
In 1904 the western Abkhaz border was changed, with the area west and north of the Bzyb River removed and merged into Chernmorski okrug, apparently so as to include a new luxury holiday resort at Gagra built by Duke Alexander of Oldenburg within Russia. Following the 1917 Russian Revolution, the peoples of the southern Caucasus had seceded from Russia, declared the Transcaucasian Democratic Federative Republic (TDFR) in 1918 and started peace talks with the Ottomans. Meanwhile, Sukhum Okrug had declared itself semi-autonomous on 9 November 1917 under the Abkhazian Peoples Council (APC). At the instigation of the Georgian politician Akaki Chkhenkeli, the 1904 boundary change of western Abkhazia was reversed in December 1917 and the old Begepsta river border restored. In early 1918 the APC met with Georgian leaders, and the two sides made an initial agreement that Abkhazia would constitute Sukhum okrug, including Samurzakano (despite its Mingrelian majority), and stretching along the Black Sea coast as far at the river Mzymta. The Bolsheviks invaded Abkhazia in April 1918 but were repulsed the following month.

Meanwhile, internal disagreements in the TDFR led to Georgia leaving the federation in May 1918, followed shortly thereafter by Armenia and Azerbaijan. Georgian and Abkhaz officials met in an attempt to hammer out a deal, with Georgia pushing to include Abkhazia within Georgia but as an autonomous region, however many Abkhaz leaders feared that Georgia aimed to 'Georgian-ise' the region and annex it outright. 
Discussions between Georgian and Russian Volunteer Army forces in early 1919 at demarcating a border proved difficult. Some Georgians initially claimed a north-western border that stretched north-west as far as the Makopse river. British forces active in the region proposed a border along the river Mzymta. By mid-1919 a stalemate had emerged whereby the river Mekhadry provided a de facto boundary. Russia recognised the independence of Georgia via the Treaty of Moscow (1920). It was agreed that Georgia would consist of the former Governorates of Tiflis, Kutaisi and Batumi, plus Sukhum and Zakatal okrugs. Article 3.1 of the Treaty stated that "The state frontier between Russia and Georgia, runs from the Black Sea, along the river Psou to Mount Akhakheha, passes over Mount Akhakheha and Mount Agapet, and continues along the northern frontier of the former Chernomorsk, Kutais, and Tiflis provinces to the Zakatalsk circuit and along the eastern boundary thereof up to the frontier of Armenia." Article 3.4 stated that a more precise demarcation would occur in due course.

Meanwhile, disputes between Abkhaz and Georgian officials continued, however these were rendered moot when in 1920 Russia's Red Army invaded Georgia in 1921. Abkhazia was designated as the Socialist Soviet Republic of Abkhazia, on the proviso that it would later join the Georgian Soviet Socialist Republic under a 'special union treaty'. Russia initially restored the 1864 border along the Begepsta, however this was reversed in 1929 and the Psou border restored. Georgia was later incorporated along with Armenia and Azerbaijan in the Transcaucasian SFSR within the USSR. The Georgian SSR was reconstituted in 1936, incorporating Abkhazia as the (downgraded) Abkhaz Autonomous Soviet Socialist Republic.

 
Following Joseph Stalin's deportation of ethnic groups accused of collaboration with the Nazis, the Georgia–Russia border was altered in Georgia's favour in 1944, with Georgia gaining Klukhori from Karachay-Cherkessia in the west (comprising Karachayevsk, Teberda and Mount Elbrus) and Akhalkhevi from the Chechen-Ingush ASSR in the east (comprising Itum-Kale and surrounding lands). Following the death of Stalin, these changes were reversed from 1955 to 1957 and the pre-1944 border restored.

The boundary became an international frontier in 1991 following the dissolution of the Soviet Union and the independence of its constituent republics. However fighting broke between Georgia and the autonomous regions of Abkhazia and South Ossetia, resulting in the de facto independence of both. Georgia and Russia began work on delimiting their border in 1993. In 2008 Georgia attempted to restore its control over South Ossetia, sparking a war with Russia, following which Russia recognised the independence of both South Ossetia and Abkhazia. As a result, all border discussions with Georgia were ended, however the Abkhaz and Russian authorities have continued work on that section of the border. From the Russian, Abkhaz and Ossetian point of view the Georgia–Russia border has now become much shorter (from 694 to 365 km), and is separated into two portions, a western one between Abkhazia and South Ossetia and an eastern one between South Ossetia and Azerbaijan. From the Georgian perspective, the Russian–Georgian border did not change after the collapse of the Soviet Union, and both self-declared republics are illegal entities occupying Georgian territory.

In 2011 a dispute arose over the village of Aibgha as Russia and Abkhazia set about demarcating their common border. Russia proposed annexing Aibgha to Krasnodar Krai, a move which was opposed by the Abkhaz government. Georgia has opposed any moves to transfer what it sees as Georgian territory.

Border crossings
The only Georgia–Russia border crossing is at Zemo Larsi/Verkhny Lars on the Georgian Military Highway, connecting Kazbegi (Georgia) and Vladikavkaz (North Ossetia-Alania (Russia)). There is an Akbkhazia-Russia border crossing point at Psou-Adler, and a South Ossetia-Russia border crossing at Nizhniy Zermag- Zemo Roka (the Roki Tunnel).

See also
 Abkhazia–Russia relations
 Georgia–Russia relations
 Russia–South Ossetia relations

References

Works cited
 

 
Borders of Georgia (country)
Borders of Russia
Borders of Abkhazia
Borders of South Ossetia
Internal borders of the Soviet Union
Abkhazia–Russia relations
Georgia (country)–Russia relations
Russia–South Ossetia relations
International borders
1991 establishments in Georgia (country)
1991 establishments in Russia